New Castle Junior/Senior High School is a public school located in New Castle, Pennsylvania in Lawrence County. It is part of the New Castle Area School District which serves New Castle, South New Castle, and Taylor Township. 

The school is a combined junior high school and (senior) high school, educating students in 7th through 12th grades. Its total student population is between 1,300 and 1,500. It has a student-to-teacher ratio of 14 to 1.

Faculty and staff
The senior high school principal is Richard Litrenta. Carol Morell is the junior high principal.

Extracurricular activities
Students participate in many activities, including sports and forensics. Football, basketball, and soccer are popular team sports. Philip Henry Bridenbaugh and Lindy Lauro coached the football team for a combined 67 years, both with excellent winning records; in 1991 the school recorded its 600th football win, the first in Pennsylvania and the fifth in the US to achieve the milestone. The school's football field is officially named Lauro-Bridenbaugh Field at Taggart Stadium to honor both coaches. In the 2010s, the basketball boys won back-to-back WPIAL Championships and coach Blundo was voted Pittsburgh Post-Gazette's 2013 Boys Basketball Coach of the Year.

Notable people
Philip Henry Bridenbaugh, mathematics teacher and coach
Dick Cangey, stuntman and actor
Ben Ciccone, football player, Pittsburgh Steelers, Chicago Cardinals
William C. Chip, U.S. Marine Corps Major general and Quartermaster General
Bruce Clark, football player
Paul Cuba, football player, Philadelphia Eagles
Nick DeCarbo, football player, Pittsburgh Pirates
Malik Hooker, football player, Indianapolis Colts
John Kiriakou, former CIA agent

Mark Mangino, football coach, University of Kansas, Iowa State University
Rick Razzano, football player, Cincinnati Bengals, Toronto Argonauts
Geno Stone, football player, Houston Texans
David Young, basketball player

Notes and references

External links
Junior high school website
Senior high school website

Educational institutions in the United States with year of establishment missing
Public high schools in Pennsylvania
Schools in Lawrence County, Pennsylvania
Public middle schools in Pennsylvania